The 2018 European Talent Cup is the second season of the European Talent Cup.

Calendar
The following races were scheduled to take place in 2018.

Entry list

Championship standings
Points were awarded to the top fifteen riders, provided the rider finished the race.

References

External links

2018 in motorcycle sport
2018 in Spanish motorsport